The temporoparietalis muscle is a distinct muscle of the head. It lies above the auricularis superior muscle. It lies just inferior to the epicranial aponeurosis of the occipitofrontalis muscle. The temporoparietalis muscle may be used in reconstructive ear surgery.

References 

Muscles of the head and neck